Nettleton School District may refer to:

 Nettleton School District (Arkansas), based in Nettleton, Arkansas.
 Nettleton School District (Mississippi), based in Nettleton, Mississippi.